In mathematics, equivariant topology is the study of topological spaces that possess certain symmetries. In studying topological spaces, one often considers continuous maps , and while equivariant topology also considers such maps, there is the additional constraint that each map "respects symmetry" in both its domain and target space.

Heuristically speaking, standard topology views two spaces as equivalent "up to deformation," while equivariant topology considers spaces equivalent up to deformation so long as it pays attention to any symmetry possessed by both spaces. A famous theorem of equivariant topology is the Borsuk–Ulam theorem, which asserts that every -equivariant map  necessarily vanishes.

Induced G-bundles 
An important construction used in equivariant cohomology and other applications includes a naturally occurring group bundle (see principal bundle for details).

Often, the total space is written .

More generally, the assignment  actually does not map to  generally.

Applications to discrete geometry 
In the same way that one can deduce the ham sandwich theorem from the Borsuk-Ulam Theorem, one can find many applications of equivariant topology to problems of discrete geometry. This is accomplished by using the configuration-space test-map paradigm:

Given a geometric problem ,  we define the configuration space, which parametrizes all associated  solutions to the problem (such as points, lines, or arcs.) Additionally, we consider a test space  and a map  where  is a solution to a problem if and only if . The problem  is solved if we can show the nonexistence of an equivariant map .

In this case, a nonvanishing map would also induce a nonvanishing section  from the discussion above, so , the top Stiefel–Whitney class would need to vanish.

Examples 
 The identity map  will always be equivariant. 
 If we let  act antipodally on the unit circle, then is equivariant, since it is an odd function.
 Any map  is equivariant when  acts trivially on the quotient, since  for all .

See also 
Equivariant cohomology
Equivariant stable homotopy theory
G-spectrum

References

Group actions (mathematics)
Topological spaces
Topology